Cry Wolf (stylized as Cry_Wolf) is a 2005 American slasher film directed by Jeff Wadlow and co-written by Wadlow and Beau Bauman. The film stars Julian Morris, Jon Bon Jovi, Lindy Booth, Jared Padalecki and Gary Cole. It follows a group of teenagers at a remote elite boarding school who play a group parlor game called Cry Wolf by spreading rumors of a serial killer nicknamed "The Wolf". This leads to the discovery of a young woman's body on campus, putting the lives of those who played the game in legitimate danger

Cry Wolf was released in the United States on September 16, 2005, earning $32.5 million worldwide from a $1 million budget. It received largely negative reviews from critics.

Plot

A group of prep school students consisting of Graham, Mercedes, Lewis, Randall, Regina, Tom, Dodger and Owen play a game called Cry Wolf, where someone is marked as a "wolf" and the group tries to figure out who it is.

After meeting his new journalism teacher, Mr. Walker, Owen and Tom meet the others for lunch. They discuss the police finding a girl's body, Becky, after it was dragged through the woods by a wolf. The group considers who could have murdered Becky, when Dodger proposes expanding Cry Wolf to the entire school. Owen suggests creating a fake e-mail telling everyone about a serial killer who goes from campus to campus stalking and killing students. They describe the killer as wearing an orange ski mask, a green camouflage jacket, steel toe combat boots, black tactical leather gloves, brandishing a hunting knife or a high-powered handgun. That night, they send out the e-mail.

The next day, the entire school has spread the story in the e-mail. Owen receives an instant message from someone using the name 'Wolf'. Tom and Owen accuse Dodger, but she claims she was studying with Regina.

Tom and Owen find their dorm room trashed. When the instant messenger comes up on Owen's laptop, they find a piercing stud and blood on Owen's keyboard. Tom blames Regina, who has a recipe for fake blood. When accused, she insists she was on a field trip.

Believing Dodger is lying, Owen confronts her. Dodger informs him that she was visiting her mother. Deciding that Randall is behind the odd behavior, Owen tries tracking him down, to no avail. Owen again seeks out Dodger, and finds her kissing Mr. Walker.

In his journalism class the next day, when Owen reaches into his bag for supplies, a hunting knife falls out. Mr. Walker escorts Owen to the Headmistress's office. Owen tells Mr. Walker that he knows about his relationship with Dodger, and that he will tell the headmistress if Walker reveals the knife. Mr. Walker agrees not to say anything.

On the night of Halloween, 'Wolf' attacks Owen. Thinking Tom was trying to prank him, Owen goes to leave with Tom's car, but sees Wolf behind him. The attacker ends up being Mercedes, who was trying to prove that attackers can be women.

The following day, Owen and Mercedes meet with the headmistress, who decides that Owen's fate will be decided over the weekend. The rest of the group is forced to stay at school over the weekend. Owen contacts them to meet in the chapel. Owen, Dodger, Tom, Lewis and Regina meet and try to get to the bottom of the attacks. While Lewis is on the phone, Mercedes is apparently attacked in the bathroom by Wolf. Lewis runs out as Owen tries to call for help.

Owen, Regina and Tom find Randall's body in a confessional. Owen goes looking for Dodger, and sees Lewis get attacked. Owen runs to the parking lot to see Mr. Walker still on campus. Owen runs to Mr. Walker's office as his phone rings. Owen answers to Dodger crying on the other end; she has found Mercedes dead. Dodger tells Owen she is coming and can see him through the window. He looks out to see Wolf kill her. Afterwards, Mr. Walker enters the room. Upon noticing that Mr. Walker has a jacket, an orange mask and a knife, Owen shoots him. The door is suddenly opened by Dodger, Tom and Regina.

Owen is arrested for murder while the group admits that it was a prank to get Mercedes and Owen back for making them stay on campus. Randall, Mercedes and Lewis are alive and well. Mr. Walker was involved with Becky, the gun in his desk having been used to kill her. Dodger visits Owen, who has been released on bail, and says she would never have played the game if she knew Mr. Walker was cheating on her, revealing she organized everything. Dodger killed Becky because she was jealous of Mr. Walker's relationship with her and had set up the game knowing that Owen would blame Mr. Walker for the killings, thereby killing him and making her happy. Despite Owen threatening to report her, Dodger replies that no one will believe him and leaves.

Cast

Release
America Online also helped publicizing the film in July/August 2005; launching an alternate reality game for AIM users to play by sending instant messages to each other, which ran for the duration of the film's promotion. The game itself ran similarly to the popular game 'Mafia'; just replacing townspeople and mafia with sheep and wolves. The film was released theatrically in the United States on September 16, 2005. At the box office, Cry Wolf grossed $10 million in the US and $22.5 million internationally, for a worldwide total of $32.5 million.

Reception
The website's critics consensus reads: "Dull and derivative, Cry_Wolf is a subpar slasher that even ardent fans of the genre may find difficult to enjoy." Audiences polled by CinemaScore gave the film an average grade of "B–" on an A+ to F scale.

Writing for the magazine Variety, John Anderson said that "there are surprises intrinsic to the storyline [...]", but adding that "there’s not enough tension to make the viewer care that much for the various hoaxes and faux-slayings perpetrated by the film’s largely unlikable gang of privileged brats. In an era of increasingly sophisticated thrillers, “Cry Wolf" is a bit antique.", Anderson concluded.

Ryan Larson, of the website Bloody Disgusting, praised the performance of Jon Bon Jovi and said that "diving deep into the production of this film is fascinating" and added that "Cry Wolf feels so 2000s in all the best and worst ways", but concluded that "being the mid-2000s, however, the film is also bogged down with homophobia and some outdated terminology that will make you cringe when watching."

In January 2023, Stacey Grant of teen magazine Seventeen ranked Cry Wolf as the eight best teen movie of the 2000s out of seventeen films.

References

External links

 
 
 
 
 

2005 films
2005 horror films
2000s teen horror films
2000s slasher films
American slasher films
American teen horror films
Films set in boarding schools
2000s English-language films
Films about pranks
Films directed by Jeff Wadlow
Films scored by Michael Wandmacher
Films shot in Virginia
Rogue (company) films
Relativity Media films
2005 directorial debut films
2000s American films